Edwin Cubero Rivera (11 February 1924 - 8 March 2000) was a Costa Rican professional footballer who played for several clubs in Costa Rica and Mexico, enjoying his greatest success with Atlas.

Club career
Born in San Antonio de Belén, Cubero is the all-time leading goalscorer for Atlas and was an important part of the club during the 1950-51 season, their first championship-winning season. He joined Puebla after Atlas released him.

Later life and death
After retiring as a player, Cubero founded the Mudanzas Cubero moving company.

In March 2000, Cubero died from renal failure in Guadalajara, Mexico.

References

1924 births
2000 deaths
Association football forwards
People from Heredia Province
Costa Rican footballers
Liga MX players
Atlas F.C. footballers
Club Puebla players
Costa Rican expatriate footballers
Expatriate footballers in Mexico
Costa Rican expatriate sportspeople in Mexico
Costa Rican businesspeople
20th-century businesspeople